Ryan Tramonte is an Australian-Italian rugby league player who represented Italy in the 2013 World Cup.

Playing career
He played for the Windsor Wolves in the NSW Cup as a second rower.

References

1982 births
Living people
Australian rugby league players
Australian people of Italian descent
Italy national rugby league team players
Rugby league players from Sydney
Rugby league second-rows
Windsor Wolves players